Wayne Smith (born February 12, 1943 in Kamsack, Saskatchewan) was a professional ice hockey defenceman who played for the Chicago Black Hawks in the National Hockey League from 1966 to 1967. He played the following season with Portland Buckaroos of the Western Hockey League and retired in 1968 to pursue his business career. Smith was an executive with May Department Store, Martin Lawrence Galleries and  The Walt Disney Company. He has lived in Palos Verdes Estates, California since 1981. He graduated from the University of Denver in 1966 with a degree in business administration and received his MBA in 1967. He is the nephew of Hockey Hall of Famer Clint 'Snuffy' Smith.

Awards and honours

References

External links

1943 births
Boston Bruins scouts
Chicago Blackhawks players
Columbus Blue Jackets scouts
Denver Pioneers men's ice hockey players
Ice hockey people from Saskatchewan
Living people
People from Kamsack, Saskatchewan
Canadian ice hockey defencemen
AHCA Division I men's ice hockey All-Americans